Gardiner Wright Mansion, also known as The Marsh House, is a historic regency mansion in Georgetown, Sussex County, Delaware.  It was built in 1841, and is a two-story stuccoed brick dwelling. The plan consists of two parallel rectangular sections, with a two-story brick central hall running between them. It was extensively renovated in the late-1940s. On the property are a contributing wood shed and two-level milk house.

The site was added to the National Register of Historic Places in 1979.

References

Houses on the National Register of Historic Places in Delaware
Houses completed in 1841
Regency architecture in the United States
Second Empire architecture in Delaware
Italianate architecture in Delaware
Houses in Georgetown, Delaware
National Register of Historic Places in Sussex County, Delaware